Fuquan Olympic School is a co-educational, private school, located in the town of Duruan in Jiangmen, Guangdong Province, People's Republic of China. The current principal is Mr. Jinhong Luo with an enrolment of approximately 1500 students from kindergarten to junior high school. Geographically, the school covers an area of 31,209 square meters, nestled within the surrounding hills of the Great Xikeng forest.

Campus 
Fuquan has 33 classes from kindergarten to junior high school. The campus boasts a number of basketball courts, volleyball courts, badminton courts, a 300-meter track and a soccer field, a swimming pool and an indoor gymnasium.

Academics and awards 
Fuquan has a strong tradition in mathematics competitions. The school has been designated by the Chinese Ministry of Education as an "Experimental School for the Reform of English-Language Education at the Elementary Level", and is classified as a First-Rank School in Jiangmen.

References 

Private schools in China
Jiangmen
Schools in Guangdong
Educational institutions established in 1998
1998 establishments in China